Lourdes Figueroa Araujo (born April 21, 1988) is a Guatemalan actress, model, fashion designer and beauty pageant titleholder. In May 2009, she was crowned Miss Guatemala 2009 and participated in the Miss Universe 2009 pageant that was broadcast live on NBC, August 23, 2009. On August 15, 2009, she competed against 83 other delegates in the Lazy River Tube Race where she was victorious. After competing in Miss Universe 2009, in which she did not place, she traveled to Miami, United States, to model there, and she was chosen to represent Guatemala at the Miss World 2011, held on November 6.  Figueroa finished in the Top 20.

Miss Universe 2009 contestants
1988 births
Living people
Miss Guatemala winners
Guatemalan emigrants to Mexico
Guatemalan beauty pageant winners
Miss World 2011 delegates